Meles is a genus of badgers containing four living species known as Eurasian badgers, the Japanese badger (Meles anakuma), Asian badger (Meles leucurus), Caucasian badger (Meles canescens) and European badger (Meles meles). In an older categorization, they were seen as a single species with three subspecies (Meles meles anakuma, Meles meles leucurus and Meles meles meles). There are also several extinct members of the genus. They are members of the subfamily Melinae of the weasel family, Mustelidae.

Taxonomy
The genus Meles was erected by French zoologist Mathurin Jacques Brisson in 1762 after Carl Linnaeus had described the Eurasian badger Meles meles in 1758. This animal had a very extensive range over most of temperate Europe and Asia and there has been much discussion as to whether it is a single or three distinct species. There are geographical differences between individuals from different parts of the range in skull structure, morphology of the first premolar teeth, and facial markings. Some authorities advocated placing European and Asian badgers in separate species, Meles meles and Meles leptorhynchus (Milne-Edwards, 1867), the boundary between the two being the Volga River. Others considered three subspecies, M. m. meles found west of the Volga, M. m. arenarius-leptorhynchus found between the Volga and Transbaikalia, and M. m. amurensis-anakuma from the Amur and Primorsky regions.

Genetic studies of mitochondrial DNA show the separation of two variants on either side of the Volga but their exact taxonomic rank remains undefined. A further study of cheek teeth from individuals across the entire range supports this division and provides confirmation that M. meles and M. anakuma are indeed separate species.

Extant species

Fossils

A further species is Meles thorali from the late Pleistocene, known only from fossil remains, specimens of which have been found at Saint-Vallier, Drôme, in southeastern France and Binagady, in Azerbaijan. These have large cheek teeth and characteristics intermediate between M. meles and M. anakuma. It is theorized that they were an ancestral species from which these two modern species diverged. Another extinct species from Europe is Meles hollitzeri from the Early Pleistocene, remains of which were found in Deutsch-Altenburg, in northeastern Austria, and Untermassfeld, in southeastern Germany.

References

Cited texts

External links

Badgers
Mammal genera
Taxa named by Mathurin Jacques Brisson
Extant Pleistocene first appearances